Bhaitech Racing (sometimes stylised as BhaiTech Racing) was an Italian automotive research and development service provider and motorsport team.

History

Racing
Bhaitech made its racing debut in 2012, contesting the Italian GT Championship using a McLaren 12C GT3. A year later, the team contested the International GT Open and clinched the GTS Teams' and Drivers' titles with Giorgio Pantano. In 2014, BhaiTech competed in the Blancpain Sprint Series which saw them finish seventh in the Cup category of the Teams' Championship.

After a year's sabbatical from motorsports, Bhaitech returned to racing in 2016, competing in the Italian F4 Championship, which saw them claim podium finishes with Richard Verschoor and Lorenzo Colombo. A year later, the team clinched the teams' title and the rookie championship with Leonardo Lorandi while Colombo and Sebastian Fernandez claimed third and fourth in the 2017 championship respectively. In 2018, the team claimed a second rookie championship title with Petr Ptáček, while Lorandi narrowly missed out on the title to Enzo Fittipaldi.

In November 2018, it was announced Bhaitech would expand into the Formula Renault Eurocup championship for 2019, reuniting with Ptáček and signing Italian F4 race winner Federico Malvestiti. In January 2019, Bhaitech made their first driver signings with Umberto Laganella, Mikhail Belov, Nicola Marinangeli and Matteo Nannini joining the outfit for the Italian F4 Championship.

Technology
Bhaitech also specialized in research and development in the automotive and motorsport fields. In 2018, Bhaitech entered into a strategic partnership with Altran Italia.

Former series results

Italian GT Championship

International GT open 

* Guest driver ineligible for points

† Shared results with another team

Blancpain Sprint Series 

† Shared results with another team

ADAC Formula 4 

* Guest driver ineligible for points

Formula Renault Eurocup

Italian F4 Championship

† Shared results with another team

Timeline

References

External links

Italian auto racing teams
Formula Renault Eurocup teams
International GT Open teams
Auto racing teams established in 2011
Auto racing teams disestablished in 2021